Hallyday is a surname. Notable people with the surname include:

David Hallyday (born 1966), French singer-songwriter and racing driver
 Estelle Hallyday (born 1966), French actress and model
Johnny Hallyday (1943–2017), French singer and actor

See also
 Halladay
 Halliday